Prosultiamine (INN; also known as thiamine propyl disulfide or TPD; brand name Jubedel,) is a disulfide thiamine derivative discovered in garlic in Japan in the 1950s, and is a homolog of allithiamine. It was developed as a treatment for vitamin B1 deficiency.  It has improved lipid solubility relative to thiamine and is not rate-limited by dependency on intestinal transporters for absorption, hence the reasoning for its development.

Research
It has been studied as a potential treatment for infection with human T-lymphotropic virus (HTLV), since it has been shown to reduce viral load and symptoms.

See also 
 Vitamin B1 analogue

References 

Formamides
Organic disulfides
Aminopyrimidines
Thiamine